The CONCACAF Beach Soccer Championship is the main championship for beach soccer in North America, Central America and the Caribbean, contested between senior men's national teams of the members of CONCACAF. It is the sport's version of the better known CONCACAF Gold Cup in association football.

The winners of the championship are crowned continental champions; the tournament also acts as the qualification route for North American nations to the upcoming edition of the FIFA Beach Soccer World Cup and is therefore also known as the FIFA Beach Soccer World Cup CONCACAF qualifier. Coinciding with the annual staging of the World Cup, the competition took place yearly until 2010; the World Cup then became biennial, and as its supplementary qualification event, the championship followed suit.

The championship was established in 2006 after FIFA made it a requirement for all confederations to begin holding qualification tournaments to determine the best national team(s) in their region and hence those who would proceed to represent their continent in the upcoming World Cup (previously, nations were simply invited to play without having to earn their place). The first edition was proceeded by a joint qualification tournament with CONMEBOL in 2005; a second and final joint event was held in 2007. FIFA currently allocate North America two berths at the World Cup and hence the top two teams (the winners and the runners-up) qualify to the World Cup finals.

North America's governing body for football, CONCACAF, organize the championship, with cooperation from Beach Soccer Worldwide (BSWW).

Mexico are the most successful nation with four titles. El Salvador and the United States and are the other multiple title winners with two each; the former are also current champions. This trio have dominated the championship, finishing in the top four together in seven of the nine tournaments.

Results
  Joint championship with CONMEBOL

There have been nine editions of the championship as of 2021. For all tournaments, the top two teams qualified for the FIFA Beach Soccer World Cup. 

In terms of qualification to the World Cup, Mexico and the United States have achieved the most, finishing well enough in the championship to advance to the World Cup finals on six occasions each. Along with El Salvador and Costa Rica, these four nations are the only ones to qualify more than once thus far.

Performance

Successful nations

Awards

All-time top goalscorers
As of 2021

The following table shows the all-time top 20 goalscorers.

All-time table 
As of 2021

Joint event results not included.

Key:
Appearances App / Won in normal time W = 3 points / Won in extra-time W+ = 2 points / Won on penalty shoot-out WP = 1 point / Lost L = 0 points / Points per game PPG

Appearances & performance timeline 
The following is a performance timeline of the teams who have appeared in the CONCACAF Beach Soccer Championship and how many appearances they each have made.
Legend

 – Champions
 – Runners-up
 – Third place
 – Fourth place
5th–16th – Fifth to sixteenth place
QF – Quarter-finals
R1 – Round 1 (group stage)

× – Did not enter
•• – Entered but withdrew
DQ – Disqualified
 – Hosts
Apps – No. of appearances 

Timeline

Performance of qualifiers at the World Cup

The following is a performance timeline of the CONCACAF teams who have gone on to appear in the World Cup, having successfully qualified from the above events.

Legend

 – Champions
 – Runners-up
 – Third place
 – Fourth place
 – Hosts (qualify automatically)

QF – Quarter-finals
R1 – Round 1 (group stage)
q – Qualified for upcoming tournament
Total – Total times qualified for World Cup

Timeline

References

External links
Beach Soccer, at CONCACAF official website
Beach Soccer Worldwide, official website

 
FIFA Beach Soccer World Cup qualification
CONCACAF competitions
Beach soccer competitions
Recurring sporting events established in 2006